The Greek-Catholic Church in Bocșa is a church in Bocșa, Sălaj, Romania. The mausoleum of Simion Bărnuțiu, which is listed as a historic monument, is located inside the church. Iuliu Hossu consecrated the church on September 8, 1937.

Footnotes

External links 
  Mormântul și monumentul lui Simion Bărnuțiu
  În satul lui Bărnuțiu

Bocsa
Historic monuments in Sălaj County
Churches in Sălaj County